John Vilhelm Bjørnstad (9 March 1888 – 3 June 1968) was a Norwegian rowing coxswain who competed for Christiania Roklub. He competed in coxed fours (inriggers) and in coxed eights at the 1912 Summer Olympics in Stockholm.

References

1888 births
1968 deaths
Rowers from Oslo
Norwegian male rowers
Rowers at the 1912 Summer Olympics
Olympic rowers of Norway
Coxswains (rowing)